The Joy of Life is a 2005 experimental landscape documentary film by filmmaker Jenni Olson about the history of suicide at the Golden Gate Bridge, and the adventures of a butch lesbian in San Francisco, California. Following its January 2005 premiere at the  Sundance Film Festival, the film played a pivotal role in renewing debate about the need for a suicide barrier on the Golden Gate Bridge and garnered praise and awards for its unique filmmaking style.

The film combines 16mm landscape cinematography with a lyrical voiceover (performed by LA-based artist/actor Harriet “Harry” Dodge) to share two San Francisco stories: the history of the Golden Gate Bridge as a suicide landmark, and the story of a lesbian in San Francisco searching for love and self-discovery.

The two stories are punctuated by Lawrence Ferlinghetti's reading of his ode to San Francisco, "The Changing Light", and bookended by opening and closing credits music from legendary 1950s icon (and probable Golden Gate suicide) Weldon Kees. The film is dedicated to the memory of Mark Finch, who committed suicide by jumping from the bridge in January 1995.

Reception and aftermath
The film was awarded several prizes including: the 2005 Marlon Riggs Award (for courage & vision in Bay Area filmmaking) by the San Francisco Film Critics Circle; the 2005 Outstanding Artistic Achievement Award by Outfest, the Los Angeles Gay and Lesbian Film Festival and the 2005 Best US Narrative Screenplay Award from The New Festival, New York Lesbian and Gay Film Festival.

January 14, 2005 the San Francisco Chronicle published an op-ed by writer-director Jenni Olson (an excerpt from the script of the film) calling for a suicide barrier on the Golden Gate Bridge. The following week (on January 19) the Chronicle broke the news that filmmaker Eric Steel had been shooting suicide leaps from the bridge during the calendar year of 2004 for his film  The Bridge, which would be released in 2006. A week later "The Joy of Life" world premiered at the Sundance Film Festival and video copies of the film were circulated to members of the Golden Gate Bridge District board of directors (with the help of the Psychiatric Foundation of Northern California).

External links
 Official site
 

2005 films
American LGBT-related films
Documentary films about lesbians
Documentary films about San Francisco
Documentary films about suicide
Golden Gate Bridge
American avant-garde and experimental films
LGBT culture in San Francisco
2000s avant-garde and experimental films
2005 LGBT-related films
2000s English-language films
2000s American films